Sartodi is a small village in Maharashtra. It is located in Palghar district in Palghar taluka. Politicians used it for voting but never raised a helping hand. Since 2008 there have been improvements in water supply and transport.

Sartodi is reached by Auto Rikshaw from Saphale railway station on the Western Railway (cost 25 to 30Rs per trip).

References

Villages in Palghar district